A photon is an elementary particle of light.

Photon may also refer to:

Arts and entertainment
Photon (comics), two superheroes in the Marvel Comics universe, both formerly known as "Captain Marvel"
Photon (Image Comics), a comic book superhero from Image Comics
Photon (anime), a Japanese animated video series
Photon: The Ultimate Game on Planet Earth, the original lasertag game
Photon (TV series), a short-lived television show tied into the game

Computers and smartphones
Photon, the codename of Microsoft's Windows Phone operating system
Photon OS, an operating system released by VMWare
Motorola Photon, a Motorola smartphone

Music
Photon (EP), an EP by Bailter Space
Photon (album), a 2002 album by Japanese duo Boom Boom Satellites
Photon, a song by VNV Nation from the album Automatic

Other uses
Photon, the Higonnet and Moyroud's Lumitype
Photon, a satellite bus developed by Rocket Lab
Photon (arcade cabinet), a Soviet arcade cabinet

See also
 Foton (disambiguation)